The 1976 Oregon Webfoots football team represented the University of Oregon in the Pacific-8 Conference (Pac-8) during the 1976 NCAA Division I football season. Led by third-year head coach Don Read, the Ducks were  overall  in the Pac-8, tied  and were outscored 

Six days after the season-ending win at Oregon State in the Civil War, Read was fired on the day after Thanksgiving. with a year remaining on a four-year contract ($28,000  He was succeeded by 35-year-old Rich Brooks in mid-December.

Schedule

Roster

References

External links
 Game video (color) – Washington State at Oregon – October 30, 1976

Oregon
Oregon Ducks football seasons
Oregon Webfoots football